Michael Usher is an Australian television presenter and reporter. Usher presents Seven News Sydney on Friday and Saturday with Angela Cox and The Latest: Seven News.

Career
Usher graduated from All Saints' College, Perth in 1987. He went on to study media in 1989 at West Australian Academy of Performing Arts and graduated with an Associate Diploma in Media Studies.

Nine Network 
Usher's television career began in 1990 at the Golden West Television Network, Bunbury, as a final year cadet journalist. He was then posted to Kalgoorlie before beginning the following year at STW-9, Perth.

In 1993, Usher moved to Sydney and to TCN-9 news. Three years later he was appointed to the role of Nine Network Olympics reporter, leading the Network's coverage of the 1996 Atlanta and 2000 Sydney Olympic Games. He also went to Lausanne to cover the corruption scandal that engulfed the International Olympic Committee. He was the Nine Network's correspondent in New York when the Twin Towers were attacked in September 2001, and less than two years later was in Iraq, travelling north from Kuwait to reach Baghdad the day after the Coalition seized the city.

In 2001, Usher moved to the Nine Network's US bureau, where he worked for three years as National Nine News US correspondent, based in Los Angeles. Usher returned to Australia to fill in as host of Today, then at the beginning of 2004, together with wife Anna and young son, he moved to the UK, to cover the London bureau.

In 2006, Usher returned to Australia and began presenting Nightline, replacing Ellen Fanning. In 2007, Usher became news presenter for the Sunday program. Following the axing of Nightline in July 2008 and Sunday in August 2008, he was appointed presenter of the short-lived Nine News Sunday AM and for the rest of 2008, Usher filled-in on various Nine News bulletins as well as reporting for 60 Minutes, filling in for Tara Brown who was on maternity leave at the time.

Between November 2008 and January 2009, Usher presented the weekend bulletin of Nine News Sydney. This was after the resignation of Mike Munro and before the appointment of former weeknight presenter Mark Ferguson as the permanent weekend presenter. Also from 2009, Usher finished his role as presenter of the Sunday Morning News, as the bulletin was replaced with Weekend Today.

In March 2009, Usher was appointed as a permanent reporter for 60 Minutes. He also hosted the first leaders debate between Julia Gillard and Tony Abbott prior to the 2010 Australian Federal Election.

In December 2010, Usher presented A Current Affair while usual fill in presenter Leila McKinnon had a holiday. He also co-hosted the 2010 New Year's Eve Fireworks with Alicia Gorey. In December 2011, Usher filled in for Karl Stefanovic on Today whilst Stefanovic was on holidays.

Seven Network 
In October 2016, Usher joined the Seven Network and replaced Melissa Doyle as weekend presenter on Seven News Sydney.

In 2017, Usher began hosting Seven's new crime show Murder Uncovered.

In December 2018, Usher was appointed the presenter of The Latest: Seven News.

References

External links
 Nine News

Seven News presenters
People from Perth, Western Australia
Living people
60 Minutes (Australian TV program) correspondents
People educated at All Saints' College, Perth
1970 births
People from Rockhampton